Nowy Styl sp. z o.o. is a Polish office furniture  company. Founded in 1992 in Krosno in Poland as Nowy Styl (English: New Style). At that time it specialized mainly in office chairs. Today, the company sells products related to interior design, furniture and stadium seatings. With time, the company developed new brands and in 2003 Nowy Styl changed its name to the Nowy Styl Group. In 2007, the Group had PLN 930 million of sales and PLN 70 million of net income.

In February 2011 the Nowy Styl Group acquired German seating manufacturer Sato Office. In 2013, they acquired Rohde & Grahl GmbH, another German office furniture manufacturer.

References

Furniture companies of Poland
Manufacturing companies established in 1992
Polish brands
Polish Limited Liability Companies
Design companies established in 1992
Polish companies established in 1992